The Rivière aux Rognons (English: Kidneys River) is a tributary of the northeast shore of the Jeannotte River, flowing in the municipality of Lac-Édouard and the town of La Tuque, in the administrative region of Mauricie, in province, in Quebec, in Canada.

The course of the “Rivière aux Rognons” descends on the west side of the Batiscan River and on the east side of the Saint-Maurice River. This river is part of the hydrographic side of the Batiscan River which generally winds south to the north bank of the St. Lawrence River.

The course of the “Rivière aux Rognons” descends entirely into the forest zone in a territory considered to be an island, taking into account that lac Édouard (Quebec) has two outlets. This island is bounded by the Batiscan River (to the east), the Jeannotte River (to the west) and the Lake Édouard (Quebec) (to the north). The river surface is generally frozen from mid-December until the end of March.

Since the middle of the 19th century, forestry has been the predominant activity of the "Rivière aux Rognons" watershed.

Geography 
The "Rivière aux Rognons" has its source in a forest area, at the mouth of Lac Chevautier.

Upper course of the river (segment of )
 towards the south crossing Lake Marteau (length:  in the north–south axis;) to its mouth;
 towards the South crossing Lac au Coeur (length:  in the north–south axis;) to the north shore of "Lac aux Rognons";
 towards the South, crossing the "Lac aux Rognons" (length:  in the north–south axis;), to the dam at its mouth. Note: "Lac aux Rognons" straddles the township of Trudel and the township of Laurier;

Lower river (segment of )
 south-west, to a bay on the north shore of Lac Laurier;
 towards the South, crossing Laurier Lake (length:  in the north–south axis;), to the dam at its mouth;
 to the Southwest, crossing Caribou Lake at its full length, to the dam at its mouth located to the south;
 towards the South, crossing Lake Béliveau over its full length, up to 'at its mouth. Note: Lac Béliveau is fed by the outlet (coming from the East) from Vallée, Maynard lakes;

The confluence of the “Rivière aux Rognons” is located at:
 North-West of the confluence of the Jeannotte River;
 South of the center of the village of Lac-Édouard;
 South-East of the city center of La Tuque.

Toponymy 
The term "Rognon" constitutes a family name of French origin. This term "kidneys" means the kidneys of an animal.

The toponym "Rivière aux Rognons" was formalized on December 5, 1968, at the Commission de toponymie du Québec.

See also 

List of rivers of Quebec

References 

Rivers of Mauricie
Landforms of La Tuque, Quebec